Dixon Township was a township in Logan County, North Dakota, United States. The former township government was disbanded in 2001, and the area was designated by the United States Census Bureau as Dixon Unorganized Territory. It later was merged into the West Logan Unorganized Territory.

The township was located in the western part of the county and it bordered the following other townships within Logan County:
 Red Lake Township — south
 Starkey Township (defunct) — southwest corner
 Bryant Township (defunct) — west
 Glendale Township — northwest corner

References

Defunct townships in North Dakota
Townships in Logan County, North Dakota
Townships in North Dakota